Rebecca Anna de Ruvo (born 6 December 1969 in Stockholm), is a Swedish TV presenter, actress, artist and model who is best known as host of the then new MTV Europe during the early 1990s. De Ruvo became known as the first Swedish VJ on MTV.

Career
Rebecca De Ruvo started in 1981 as a voice-over artist in the Swedish Christmas series Stjärnhuset. In 1986 she appeared in an episode of the family series Julpussar och Stjärnsmällar.

De Ruvo began her television career at age nineteen as a reporter in the youth program Druvan in 1988, as her mother Annika de Ruvo was a producer for Swedish Television SVT. De Ruvo then started on MTV in 1990 and presented the chart show MTV's Braun European Top 20. In 1991 she hosted MTV Prime. Beginning on 6 April 1992, she led the daily MTV Europe morning show Awake on the Wilde Side as well as the daily viewers voted charts Dial MTV. She also appeared as a guest hostess and cook on MTV's Most Wanted.

In addition, she founded the music group Breaker in London who published a few single discs on Coalition Records. In 1992 she hosted together with Staffan Ling TV4's program Ringling where among other celebrities took part in various competitions. After leaving MTV, in 1995-1996, she was the host of the daily music competition Music match on TV3 with Max Lorentz as a judge but has since not been active in the Swedish media again.

In 1999 she had a guest appearance in the TV series Fråga Olle.

Personal life
Ruvo is the daughter of TV producer Annika de Ruvo, who for many years worked as a TV producer at SVT's children editorial. De Ruvo has five children and describes herself as a full-time parent.

In 1994, De Ruvo had a relationship with Oasis guitarist Noel Gallagher.

References

1969 births
Living people
Swedish television hosts
Swedish women television presenters
Swedish female models